Doosri Dulhan is a 1983 Bollywood film directed by Lekh Tandon. It stars Victor Banerjee, Sharmila Tagore, Shabana Azmi in lead roles. The music of the film was composed by Bappi Lahiri.

Plot 
The film tells the story of a childless couple Anil & Renu (Victor Banerjee & Sharmila Tagore respectively) and a prostitute Chanda (Shabana Azmi), who is hired as a surrogate mother.

Adaptations 
The movie was released in Bengali under the name Uttarayan in 2006. The 2001 Hindi Chori Chori Chupke Chupke follows a similar plotline and has been compared with the film.

Soundtrack
The film's music was composed by Bappi Lahiri and the lyrics were penned by Amit Khanna.

References

External links 
 

1983 films
1980s Hindi-language films
Films directed by Lekh Tandon
Films scored by Bappi Lahiri
Hindi remakes of Tamil films
Indian pregnancy films